Domachowo  is a village in the administrative district of Gmina Trąbki Wielkie, within Gdańsk County, Pomeranian Voivodeship, in northern Poland. It is located in the historic region of Pomerania.

The village has a population of 474.

Domachowo was a private village of Polish nobility, including the Hertmański, Prądzyński and Zboiński families.

References

Domachowo